The following is a list of films originally produced and/or distributed theatrically by Paramount Pictures and released in the 1990s.

References

External links
 Paramount Pictures Complete Library

 1990-1999
American films by studio
1990s in American cinema
Lists of 1990s films